Jan Henderson Kessinger (born February 20, 1951) is an American politician. He has served as a Republican member for the 20th district in the Kansas House of Representatives since 2017.

Early life and education 
Kessinger is a fifth-generation native of Kansas who has lived in Overland Park for over 30 years. He has been involved in public service since he was a child. Both his father and grandfather served in the Kansas House of Representatives. During college, Kessinger interned in Washington, D.C., for Senator and Republican National Chairman Bob Dole.

He earned his Bachelor of Science in Journalism from the William Allen White School of Journalism at the University of Kansas.

Career 
Kessinger worked in retail management before joining Vance Publishing, an Overland Park firm, in 1976. He served as Sales Director and Associate Publisher of The Packer, the leading business publication for the fresh fruit and vegetable industry. For seven years, he was the Western Division Manager and lived in the Los Angeles area with his family.

While in California, he conducted graduate studies in business at the Graziadio School of Business and Management, Pepperdine University, and completed his MBA at the Helzberg School of Management, Rockhurst University, in 1988.

Kessinger and his family moved to Overland Park in 1984 where he became founding publisher of ProNet, Vance Publishing's leading edge online service for the fresh produce industry. The new venture created jobs for the Overland Park community.

In 1994, Henderson Kessinger Consulting (HKC) was established as a management, sales and marketing firm. As president, Kessinger works with companies both large and small across the United States and internationally to positively impact their work environment and sales. His work includes helping 35 state and provincial lotteries generate increased revenues for their jurisdictions by improving retail execution and creative strategies. He has spoken at conferences and workshops across the United States and Canada as well as in Central Europe and Central America.

In 2015, Kessinger was appointed to the Kansas Gaming and Racing Commission. In 2013/14, he consulted for the Kansas Lottery and was tasked with restructuring and reorganizing the sales team. In 2014, record sales were set, in part due to his expertise.

Kessinger also works with local businesses and Fortune 500 firms with the goal of growing and developing strong work environments and employees, simultaneously generating sales growth and profits, and in turn, creating more jobs.

Personal life 
For over 20 years, Kessinger has been a member of the United Methodist Church of the Resurrection where he volunteers as a Congregational Care Minister. He also serves on the Staff Parish, is a small group leader and has taught adult education at the church. He's active in developing the Global Impact missions program and training at Church of the Resurrection. In 2014, he traveled to South Africa for three weeks to serve on a mission trip to Mooiplaas, a settlement outside of Pretoria.

References

1951 births
Living people
Republican Party members of the Kansas House of Representatives
21st-century American politicians
People from Junction City, Kansas
Politicians from Overland Park, Kansas
University of Kansas alumni
Pepperdine University alumni
Rockhurst University alumni